Rally Cross 2 is a racing video game developed by Idol Minds and published by 989 Studios exclusively for PlayStation. It is the sequel to Rally Cross (1997).

Game modes
 Single race: Choose any vehicle and track and race against three opponents, there are three sub-modes, Normal, which is self-explanatory, Head-on, which is where one opponent races in the opposite direction of the player and Suicide which is the same as Head-on but with three opponents.
 Season: Rally through an extensive season, unlocking vehicles and tracks.
 Time Trial: Try to get the best lap-time possible on a certain track.
 Practice: Practice your rallying skills.

Some vehicles' parts (shocks, steering, brakes, ratios, gearbox and tires) can be modified to the player's liking. All vehicles' bodies can be painted as well.

The game's sixteen tracks are also available in reverse, making a total of thirty-two tracks.

Reception

The game received favorable reviews according to the review aggregation website GameRankings. Next Generation called it "a very solid second effort that sets the title well on its way to becoming an established brand – if [the developers] can keep improving the game this much every sequel." (Ironically, this is the last game in the series.)

References

External links
 

1998 video games
Multiplayer and single-player video games
Off-road racing video games
PlayStation (console) games
PlayStation (console)-only games
Video game sequels
Video games developed in the United States
Deck Nine games